This is a list of Columbus Blue Jackets award winners.

League awards

Team trophies
The Columbus Blue Jackets have not won any of the team trophies the National Hockey League (NHL) awards annually — the Stanley Cup as league champions, the Prince of Wales Trophy as Eastern Conference playoff champions and the Presidents' Trophy as the team with the most regular season points.

Individual awards

All-Stars

NHL first and second team All-Stars
The NHL first and second team All-Stars are the top players at each position as voted on by the Professional Hockey Writers' Association.

NHL All-Rookie Team
The NHL All-Rookie Team consists of the top rookies at each position as voted on by the Professional Hockey Writers' Association.

All-Star Game selections
The National Hockey League All-Star Game is a mid-season exhibition game held annually between many of the top players of each season. Fourteen All-Star Games have been held since the Columbus Blue Jackets entered the league in 2000, with at least one player chosen to represent the Blue Jackets in each year except 2001 and 2012. The All-Star game has not been held in various years: 1979 and 1987 due to the 1979 Challenge Cup and Rendez-vous '87 series between the NHL and the Soviet national team, respectively, 1995, 2005, and 2013 as a result of labor stoppages, 2006, 2010, and 2014 because of the Winter Olympic Games, and 2021 as a result of the COVID-19 pandemic. Columbus has hosted one of the games. The 60th took place at Nationwide Arena.

 All-Star Game Most Valuable Player

Career achievements

Hockey Hall of Fame
The following is a list of Columbus Blue Jackets who have been enshrined in the Hockey Hall of Fame.

Retired numbers

The Columbus Blue Jackets have retired one of their jersey numbers. Also out of circulation is the number 99 which was retired league-wide for Wayne Gretzky on February 6, 2000.

Team awards

Columbus Blue Jackets Foundation Community Service Award
The Columbus Blue Jackets Foundation Community Service Award is an annual award given to the player "who went above and beyond off the ice in support of charitable initiatives benefiting those in need throughout the community" as determined by the Blue Jackets Foundation and community development staff.

"Jackets Fans" Most Valuable Player Award
The "Jackets Fans" Most Valuable Player Award is an annual award given to the team's Most Valuable Player as determined by the fans.

"John H. McConnell" Most Courageous Player Award
The "John H. McConnell" Most Courageous Player Award is an annual award given to the player who "day in and day out exhibited hard work, dedication and a willingness to overcome obstacles in his commitment to the team" as determined by Blue Jackets players.

Most Improved Player Award
The Most Improved Player Award is an annual award given to the player "deemed to have improved the most during the course of the regular season" as determined by the team's television and radio broadcasters.

Outstanding Defenseman Award
The Outstanding Defenseman Award is given the team's top defenseman as determined by members of the local media.

Three Stars Award
The Three Stars Award is an annual award given to the player who earns the most points from Star of the game selections throughout the regular season.

See also
List of National Hockey League awards

Notes

References

Columbus Blue Jackets
award